The 993–994 carbon-14 spike was a rapid 0.91% increase in carbon-14 isotope content from tree rings dated 993-994 CE. This event was also confirmed with an associated increase of beryllium-10 in Antarctic ice core samples, supporting the hypothesis that this event was of solar origin. There were several astronomical observations during this time that correspond with the 14C and 10Be spikes, but these texts are few and far between.

In 2021, a scientific paper used the 993–994 carbon-14 spike as a benchmark in dendrochronology (tree-ring studies) to precisely determine that Vikings were present in L’Anse aux Meadows in Newfoundland exactly 1000 years prior, in 1021 AD.

Historical observations 
The solar storm hypothesis is heavily supported by several observations of aurora events from late 992 in Korea, Germany and Ireland, usually describing a red sky, presumably due to major auroras. These historical observations don't completely prove the cause of the 993-994 14C spike, but show evidence of a strong solar event taking place late 992, as they were recorded within a relatively short time frame.

In the Korean Peninsula, between December 992 and January 993, a text described "heaven's gate" opening one night.

In the Saxony region of present-day Germany, late 992, several aurora observations were made. One set of observations, recorded October 21, 992, noted that the sky reddened three times. Another set of observations, made December 26, 992, mentioned a light as bright as the sun shining for an hour, then reddening the sky, before vanishing completely.

In the Ulster region of present-day Ireland, December 26, 992, texts described the sky as "blood-red" and having a "fiery hue".

Similar events 
The 993–994 carbon-14 spike was one of only a few well-documented 14C events. Prior to this 14C event, there was a considerably larger one, the 774-775 carbon-14 spike, which was around 1.7 times as strong than the 993-994 event. Both events also had subsequent 10Be spikes, further proving that they are from strong solar activity.

See also
 List of solar storms
 774-775 carbon-14 spike

References

Geomagnetic storms
Dendrology
Stratigraphy
993
994